The Avenger or The Hairy Arm is a 1925 crime novel by the British writer Edgar Wallace.

Film adaptation
In 1960 it was adapted into a West German film The Avenger, part of a long-running series of Wallace adaptations.

References

Bibliography
The Avenger at Roy Glashan's Library

External links
 

1925 British novels
British crime novels
British novels adapted into films
Novels by Edgar Wallace
John Long Ltd books